Tony Harrington is an English football referee who referees in the English Premier League. Harrington was promoted to Select Group 1 in June 2021.

Career
Harrington began refereeing in the Teesside Junior Football Alliance aged 14, after completing a refereeing course whilst at English Martyrs School and Sixth Form College as part of The Duke of Edinburgh's Award.

After four years as an EFL assistant referee and four years as a National League referee, Harrington was appointed to the EFL Referees List at the start of the 2012–13 season.

Harrington was promoted to a Select Group 2 referee in 2016.

On 22 May 2021, Harrington refereed the 2021 FA Trophy Final at Wembley Stadium. Only eight days later, Harrington was back at Wembley when he officiated the 2021 EFL League One play-off Final between Blackpool and Lincoln City.

After becoming a Select Group 1 referee in June 2021, Harrington officiated his first Premier League game on 16 December 2021.

Personal life
He is the grandson of former Hartlepool United player Tommy McGuigan. McGuigan is in the club's record books for being in the top 10 of the all time top goal scorers list.

Harrington supports his hometown club, Hartlepool.

Prior to becoming a full-time referee, Harrington worked as a PE teacher at North Shore Academy.

References

External links 

English football referees
Living people
Premier League referees
Sportspeople from Hartlepool
People educated at English Martyrs School and Sixth Form College
Year of birth missing (living people)